Eik Banki Føroya P/F is a financial services group in the Faroe Islands, which was previously one of the two major privately owned banking firms based in the country. Established in 1832, the group, which also operated in mainland Denmark, encompassed retail, corporate and investment banking activities as well as real estate brokerage. The company was nationalised by Denmark in October 2010 after becoming insolvent, with its Danish retail banking operations being sold later in the year to the regional bank Sparekassen Lolland.

History
Eik was established in 1832 as a savings bank. In 1992 it was transferred into a guarantor savings bank, and in 2002, it was converted to a public limited company. On 11 July 2007, it was listed on the Icelandic and Danish stock exchanges as Eik Banki P/F.

In Denmark, Eik Banki founded a subsidiary bank, Eik Bank Danmark A/S. In 2007, Eik Bank Danmark acquired the Swedish Skandiabanken branch in Denmark. Skandiabanken is the leading Danish internet bank in Denmark, with around 120,000 customers. Skandiabanken was merged into Eik Bank Danmark in December 2007. In the same month Eik Bank acquired the Faroese operations of Kaupthing Bank.

The company and its Danish subsidiary were taken over by the Danish banking regulator in October 2010 after failing to meet solvency requirements set by the Financial Supervisory Authority. Trading in the company's shares and bonds was suspended on the news, and Eik Banki's listing on the Nasdaq OMX Iceland exchange was subsequently cancelled. Subsequently 70% of the bank's shares were sold to Tórshavn based TF Holding for DKK 572 million. The bank later became Betri bank. Three of Eik's managers were fined DKK 150 million in 2019.

The retail banking operations of the company in mainland Denmark (Eik Bank Danmark A/S) were sold by the state to the regional bank Sparekassen Lolland for DKK 365 million on 17 December 2010.

Operations
After the sale of Eik Banki's Danish retail banking operations in December 2010, the company's principal remaining businesses are a retail and commercial banking network in the Faroe Islands and ownership of the leading Faroese real estate brokerage company, Inni P/F.

References

External links
Eik Banki official website

Bank failures
Banks of the Faroe Islands
Banks established in 1832
Danish companies established in 1832